BattleFrog College Championship was a sports competition television series directed by Ron Luscinski and written by Luscinski, Tom Davis, and Danny Llewelyn.

Hosted by Ron Pitts, sportscaster and former NFL cornerback, and Evan Dollard, from American Ninja Warrior and American Gladiators, BattleFrog College Championship showcases 16 co-ed rival college teams competing for a national championship and academic scholarships on the ultimate sprint track obstacle course built by Navy Seals; this single-elimination competition was a 350-meter, four-person relay with over 20 obstacles testing the competitors' strength, speed, and endurance.

The competing colleges for season one included: Syracuse, Texas A&M, Penn State, the N.C. State Triathlon Club, Army, Alabama, Florida, Illinois, Kentucky, Miami (FL), Michigan, Ole Miss, USC, Virginia, Wisconsin and Virginia Tech.

The three-episode series premiered on June 9, 2015, in the United States on ESPN2. Following its U.S. release, the series aired in Australia, New Zealand, Japan and Latin America.

As of August 2016, BattleFrog announced that they were closing their business.

Production 
Casting for 64 athletes from 16 U.S. colleges began in September 2014. Competitors were selected based on their GPA and athletic performance. Filming commenced in Spring 2015 in Orlando, Florida, at Rock on Adventures Ranch alongside the BattleFrog obstacle race series Central Florida festival. Acclaimed sportscaster Ron Pitts and two-time American Ninja Warrior finalist Evan Dollard hosted the three-day single-elimination competition with sideline reporters, Emily Reppert from Fox Sports Southwest and Shawn Ramirez, two-time crossfit winner.

The series was produced by '51 Dons Film, LLC, and BattleFrog Obstacle Race series, and distributed by ESPN networks.

Season One Obstacles (2015)

Season One (2015)

Season One Championship (2015) 
The Army team won the coveted trident cup and academic scholarships.

Season One Stats (2015)

Reception 

BattleFrog College Championship premiered episode one, First Round on ESPN2, Tuesday, June 9, 2015, in primetime to a critically receptive audience. Episodes two  and three subsequently aired in primetime on June 10 and 11, 2015. Following its premiere, season one aired 9 times nationally in the U.S. on ESPN Networks  and internationally in Australia, New Zealand,  Japan and Latin America. BattleFrog College Championship season one drew over two million viewers in the first week and garnered a strong fan-base making season two a highly anticipated program for 2016.

On December 4, 2015, BattleFrog Obstacle Race Series was announced as the new title sponsor of college football's Fiesta Bowl, beginning with the January 2016 game.

References

External links 
 
 BattleFrog College Championship Trailer 
 BattleFrog College Championship Season 2
 BattleFrog Obstacle Race Series
BattleFrog Fiesta Bowl

2015 American television series debuts
2010s American game shows
American sports television series
ESPN
ESPN2
ESPN media outlets
ESPN original programming
Obstacle racing television game shows
2015 American television series endings